Labidochromis mylodon is a species of cichlid endemic to Lake Malawi where it is only known to occur around Mumbo Island.  This species can reach a length of  TL.  It is also found in the aquarium trade and is also raised as a food fish.

References

Fish of Malawi
mylodon
Fish described in 1982
Taxonomy articles created by Polbot
Fish of Lake Malawi